The Thirteenth Chair is a 1919 American silent mystery film directed by Léonce Perret and starring Yvonne Delva, Creighton Hale and Marie Shotwell. It was based on a play of the same name by Bayard Veiller. Subsequent film adaptations were made in 1929 as The Thirteenth Chair and 1937 again under the same title.

Plot summary

Cast
 Yvonne Delva as Helen O'Neil 
 Creighton Hale as Willy Grosby 
 Marie Shotwell as Madame LaGrange 
 Christine May as Mrs. Philip Mason 
 Suzanne Colbert as Helen Trent 
 Georges Deneubourg as Edward Wales 
 Marc McDermott as Stephen Lee 
 Walter Law as Inspector Donohue 
 Fraunie Fraunholz

References

Bibliography
 John T. Soister, Henry Nicolella, Steve Joyce. American Silent Horror, Science Fiction and Fantasy Feature Films, 1913-1929. McFarland, 2014.

External links

 
 
 

1919 films
1910s thriller films
1910s English-language films
American silent feature films
American thriller films
American black-and-white films
Films directed by Léonce Perret
Pathé Exchange films
1910s American films
Silent mystery films
Silent thriller films